The Halcones de Ciudad Obregón (English: Ciudad Obregón Falcons) are a Mexican professional basketball team based in Ciudad Obregón, Sonora. The Halcones are members of the Circuito de Baloncesto de la Costa del Pacífico (CIBACOPA) and play their games in the Gimnasio Municipal Manuel Lira García.

History
The Trigueros de Ciudad Obregón were founding members of CIBACOPA in 2001, and won three championships until the issue of poor attendance forced the club to abandon the league in 2013. The Halcones were founded in 2016 by a group of local businessmen looking to bring professional basketball back to the city to develop and promote the sport. The team joined the Circuito de Baloncesto de la Costa del Pacífico (CIBACOPA) as an expansion team for the 2016 season, where they had a seventh-place regular-season finish before getting swept 4–0 by the eventual champions Nauticos de Mazatlán in the first round of the playoffs.

Ahead of the 2017 season, the Halcones signed American imports Kevin Capers, Mike Glover and Glen Rice Jr. That year in the playoffs, they defeated the Nauticos in seven games before dispatching the Pioneros de Los Mochis in five. In the finals, they defeated Rayos de Hermosillo 4–2 to win their first-ever championship. Rice Jr. was named Finals MVP after averaging a near-30-point triple double in the series.

In 2018, the team added Isaiah Wilkerson, J. R. Giddens and former Halcón Geron Johnson. The Halcones had a poor regular season showing, barely clinching a playoff spot with an eighth-place finish. The team again reached the finals, falling to the Tijuana Zonkeys in a six-game series.

In February 2019, Spaniard Pedro Carrillo was hired as head coach, having previously coached the Ángeles de Puebla in the LNBP. He also won a LNBP championship with Fuerza Regia de Monterrey in 2016–17 as an assistant. Although he was selected to coach the North squad at the 2019 CIBACOPA All-Star Game in Guadalajara, Carrillo left the team in June for personal reasons. In the postseason, the Halcones lost in the semi-finals to the Mantarrayas de La Paz in seven games. The Halcones lost game seven at home by a score of 105–92 despite 29 points from José Estrada.

American former top high school recruit Tony Farmer joined the team in 2020, as did Jarvis Summers and Reggie Holmes. The Halcones played two games of the 2020 season, losses to Rayos de Hermosillo and Ostioneros de Guaymas, before the league announced the season was suspended due to the COVID-19 pandemic.

Ahead of the 2022 season, the Halcones hired Ariel Rearte as head coach and announced they were moving their home arena from the Gimnasio Municipal Manuel Lira García to the Arena ITSON.

Players

Current roster

Notable alumni
 Jimmy Hall (born 1994)

Head coaches
  Eduardo Opezzo (2017)
  Ronald Guillen (2018)
  Pedro Carrillo (2019)
  Martin Knezevic (2020)
  Ariel Rearte (2022–present)

Honours

Domestic competitions
 Circuito de Baloncesto de la Costa del Pacífico
 Winners (1): 2017
 Runners-up (1): 2018

References

External links
 Official site
 Team profile at Latinbasket.com

Basketball teams in Mexico
Sports teams in Sonora
Basketball teams established in 2016
2016 establishments in Mexico